Film director Pierce Rafferty (born 8 Dec 1952) grew up in Connecticut and moved to New York City in 1982. Some of his relatives include grandfather Marvin Pierce, president and later chairman of McCall Corporation, the publisher of the popular women's magazines Redbook and McCall's; and an early New England colonist named Thomas Pierce, also an ancestor to Franklin Pierce, the 14th President of the United States. Pierce attended  Phillips Academy Andover and briefly attended Yale University.

Pierce and his former spouse, Margaret Crimmins, founded Petrified Films, Inc. in 1984, a pioneering independent stock film footage library that held the Elmer Dyer Film Library, Warner Bros. and Columbia Pictures' feature film outtakes.

Pierce spent more than a decade organizing and cataloguing vaults all over NYC that were filled to the ceilings with cans of film.  Located in New York City's The Meatpacking District, Petrified licensed archival footage to film, television, and commercial producers before being acquired by The Image Bank. The Image Bank was later acquired by Getty Images. With his brother Kevin Rafferty and Jayne Loader, Pierce made the film The Atomic Cafe (1982).

He is now Director of the Henry L. Ferguson Museum, Fishers Island, New York.

Life and career
Pierce's company, Petrified Films Inc., sold its collection in 1994 to Image Bank (now owned by Getty Images).
Is the nephew of Barbara Bush and first cousins with President George W. Bush.

Filmography
As Director, Producer:
The Atomic Cafe (1982) (co-producer)
As writer:
Heavy Petting (1989)
Miscellaneous:
The Life and Times of Hank Greenberg (1998) (archival footage) 
Theremin: An Electronic Odyssey (1994) (thanks) 
Yes: 9012Live (1986) (archival film and photo supplier) 
The Atomic Cafe (1982) (archival researcher)
Target... Earth? (1980) (archival researcher)

References

External links

American entertainment industry businesspeople
Film producers from New York (state)
Collage filmmakers
People from Connecticut
Film directors from New York City
1952 births
Living people